William Nagle was an American football coach.  He served as the second head football coach at Boston College, coaching one season in 1894 and compiling a record of 1–6.

Head coaching record

References

Year of birth missing
Year of death missing
Boston College Eagles football coaches
Mount St. Mary's University alumni